PSDS may refer to:

PSDS Deli Serdang, a football club in Indonesia
Sammarinese Democratic Socialist Party, a political party in San Marino
Product safety data sheet (PSDS), document listing information relating to occupational safety and health for the use of various products
Polyphonic Sound Detection Score (PSDS), a sound recognition evaluation metric developed by Audio Analytic